Just Off Broadway is a 1929 American silent drama film directed by Frank O'Connor and starring Donald Keith, Ann Christy and Larry Steers.

Cast
 Donald Keith as Tom Fowler  
 Ann Christy as Nan Morgan 
 Larry Steers as Marty Kirkland  
 De Sacia Mooers as Rene  
 Jack Tanner as William Grady  
 Syd Saylor as Bennie Barnett  
 Beryl Roberts as Bessie 
 Curley Dresden as Ed Fowler

References

Bibliography
 Michael R. Pitts. Poverty Row Studios, 1929-1940: An Illustrated History of 55 Independent Film Companies, with a Filmography for Each. McFarland & Company, 2005.

External links

1929 films
1929 drama films
Silent American drama films
American silent feature films
1920s English-language films
Chesterfield Pictures films
American black-and-white films
Films directed by Frank O'Connor
1920s American films